Acacia pachypoda is a shrub belonging to the genus Acacia and the subgenus Phyllodineae that is endemic to south western Australia.

Description
The spreading and prickly shrub typically grows to a height of  that has glabrous branches with light grey coloured bark. The coarsely pungent branchlets are rigid, terete and have no ribbing. Like most species of Acacia it has phyllodes rather than true leaves. It blooms from August to September and produces cream-yellow flowers. The spherical flower-heads contain around eight loosely packed cream coloured flowers. The dark brown coloured and crustaceous pods have longitudinally arranged seeds inside.

Taxonomy
The species was first formally described by the botanist Bruce Maslin in 1974 as a part of the work Studies in the genus Acacia - Miscellaneous new phyllodinous species as published in the journal Nuytsia. It was reclassified as Racosperma pachypodum in 2003 by Leslie Pedley then transferred back to genus Acacia in 2006.
A. pachypoda is closely related to Acacia castanostegia and similar in appearance to Acacia atrox.
The specific epithet is taken from the Ancient Greek   "thick" and   "foot".

Distribution
It is native to an area in the eastern Wheatbelt and Goldfields-Esperance regions of Western Australia where it is commonly situated on low rocky hills and undulating plains growing in rocky clay or sandy or stony loam soils. It has a scattered distribution from around Coolgardie in the north west to around the Frank Hann National Park in the south and east out to around Fraser Range as a part of Eucalyptus woodland or Mallee scrubland communities.

See also
 List of Acacia species

References

pachypoda
Acacias of Western Australia
Taxa named by Bruce Maslin
Plants described in 1974